Judith McCreary, aka Judi McCreary, is an American TV writer and producer. She has worked on such shows as Law & Order: Special Victims Unit, New York Undercover,CSI: Crime Scene Investigation and Criminal Minds.

External links 

"Why No Black Writers?" on the Slate website
Womens' writes, article on "The Hollywood Reporter" website

American television producers
American women television producers
American television writers
Living people
American women television writers
Place of birth missing (living people)
Year of birth missing (living people)
21st-century American women